Witchcraft (also known as Witch and Warlock) is a 1988 American supernatural horror film directed by Rob Spera and starring Anat Topol, Gary Sloan, Mary Shelley, Elizabeth Stocton, Deborah Scott, Alexander Kirkwood, Lee Kissman and Ross Newton. The screenplay was written by Jody Savin. It is the first film in the Witchcraft series, followed by Witchcraft II: The Temptress.

Plot
As Grace Churchill is having her baby, disturbing visions flash in her mind that show two witches being burned at the stake. It is later learned that these two people are John and Elizabeth Stockwell, who were burned in the year 1687. The visions seem to stop once her baby, whom she names William, is born. Things get worse when she, her husband, and the baby temporarily move into her mother-in-law’s creepy old house. It’s here that the visions start returning, and all sorts of spooky events start happening around her, including a priest hanging himself in their backyard. Grace discovers that the two witches she saw burned at the stake are her husband and mother-in-law, and they claim William as theirs. As the two try to kill Grace in a Satanic ritual, they are killed by their mute butler, leaving Grace to save William.

Cast
 Anat Topol as Grace Churchill
 Gary Sloan as John Stockton / John Stockwell
 Mary Shelley as Elizabeth Stockton / Elizabeth Stockwell
 Deborah Scott as Linda
 Lee Kissman as Ellsworth
 Ross Newton as William

Reception
Although Witchcraft was unsuccessful in theaters, it became the first in the successful Witchcraft series of direct-to-video films. In reviewing the entire series, The A.V. Club called the film a ripoff of Rosemary's Baby, but also called it the best film in the entire series. John Stanley in his Creature Feature book gave the movie two out of five stars.

Home media
The film was released on video in 1988, and re-released October 15, 1997, on DVD.

References

External links

1988 films
1988 horror films
Films about witchcraft
Direct-to-video horror films
American supernatural horror films
1980s English-language films
Films directed by Rob Spera
1980s American films